Diego García (born 3 October 1944) is a Mexican sports shooter. He competed in the mixed trap event at the 1984 Summer Olympics.

References

1944 births
Living people
Mexican male sport shooters
Olympic shooters of Mexico
Shooters at the 1984 Summer Olympics
Place of birth missing (living people)